Sphingomonas stygia is a species of bacteria. It is an aromatic compound-degrading bacteria,  it is gram-negative, non-spore-forming, non-motile and rod-shaped. It is found in deep-terrestrial-subsurface sediments.

References

Further reading
Dworkin, Martin, and Stanley Falkow, eds. The Prokaryotes: Vol. 7: Proteobacteria: Delta and Epsilon Subclasses. Deeply Rooting Bacteria. Vol. 7. Springer, 2006.

External links

LPSN

stygia
Bacteria described in 1997